Map of places in Caerphilly County Borough compiled from this list
See the list of places in Wales for places in other principal areas.

This is a list of towns and villages in the Caerphilly County Borough, Wales.

A
Aberbargoed
Abercarn
Abertridwr, Caerphilly
Abertysswg
Argoed

B
Bargoed
Bedwas
Bedwellty
Blackwood
Blaen-carno
Bont Pren
Britannia
Brithdir
Bryn
Bryncenydd
Bute Town

C
Caerphilly
Caledfryn
Castle Park
Cefn Fforest
Cefn Hengoed
Cefn Mably
Chapel of Ease
Churchill Park
Croespenmaen
Crosskeys
Crumlin
Cwmbargoed
Cwmcarn
Cwmgelli
Cwmfelinfach
Cwmsyfiog
Cwmnantygwynt

D
Deri
Draethen

E
Eglwysilan
Elliotstown
Energlyn

F
Fernlea
 Fleur-de-lis
Fochriw

G
Gellihaf
Gelligaer
Gelligroes
Gilfach
Gilfach Estate
Glan-y-nant
Graig-y-Rhacca
Groes-faen

H
Hafodyrynys
Hendredenny
Hengoed
 Hollybush

L
Lansbury Park
Llanbradach
Llanfabon
Llanfach
Llechryd, Caerphily
Llwyn Gwyn

M
Machen
Maesycwmmer
Manmoel
Markham
Mornington Meadows
Mynyddislwyn

N
Nelson
Newbridge
New Tredegar

O
 Oakdale
Ochrwyth, Risca

P
Pantside
Pantyresk
Penallta
Pengam
Penllwyn
Penmaen
Penpedairheol, Caerphilly
Pentwyn (near Fochriw)
Pentwyn (near Penyrheol)
Pentwyn (near Trinant)
Pentwynmawr
Penybryn
Penyfan
Penyrheol
Phillipstown, Caerphilly
Pontllanfraith
Pontlottyn
Pontymister
Pontywaun
 Princetown
Pwllypant

R
Rhymney
Rhymney Bridge
Risca
Rudry
Ruperra

S
Senghenydd
Springfield

T
Tir-Phil
Tir-y-berth
Trecenydd
Tredomen
Treowen, Caerphilly
Trethomas
Trinant
Troedrhiwfwch
Ty Sign

V
Van, Caerphilly

W
Waterloo
Watford, Caerphilly
Wattsville
West End
Wernddu
Woodfieldside
Wyllie

Y
Ynysddu
Ystrad Mynach

 
Caerphilly